Division No. 1, Subdivision N is an unorganized subdivision on the Avalon Peninsula in Newfoundland and Labrador, Canada in Division 1.

References

Newfoundland and Labrador subdivisions